In Greek mythology, Ardeas or Ardeias was a son of Odysseus and Circe.  He was said to have founded Ardea, a city in Latium, although others suggest Ardea was founded by Danae.

Xenagoras (historian) writes that Odysseus with Circe had three sons, Romos, Anteias and Ardeias, who built three cities and called them after their own names. The city that the Romos founded was the Rome.

Notes

References 

 Dionysus of Halicarnassus, Roman Antiquities. English translation by Earnest Cary in the Loeb Classical Library, 7 volumes. Harvard University Press, 1937-1950. Online version at Bill Thayer's Web Site
 Dionysius of Halicarnassus, Antiquitatum Romanarum quae supersunt, Vol I-IV. . Karl Jacoby. In Aedibus B.G. Teubneri. Leipzig. 1885. Greek text available at the Perseus Digital Library.
 Hesiod, Theogony from The Homeric Hymns and Homerica with an English Translation by Hugh G. Evelyn-White, Cambridge, MA.,Harvard University Press; London, William Heinemann Ltd. 1914. Online version at the Perseus Digital Library. Greek text available from the same website.

Children of Odysseus
Children of Circe